
Gmina Miastko is an urban-rural gmina (administrative district) in Bytów County, Pomeranian Voivodeship, in northern Poland.

Villages
Gmina Miastko contains the villages and settlements of Biała, Białuń, Bobięcino, Borzykowo, Byczyna, Chlebowo, Cicholas, Cieszanowo, Cisy, Czarnica, Dolsko, Domanice, Dretynek, Dretyń, Gatka, Głodowo, Gołębsko, Gomole, Grądzień, Jeżewsko, Kamnica, Kawcze, Kawczyn, Klewno, Kołacin, Kowalewice, Krzeszewo, Kwisno, Lipczyno, Lubkowo, Łaziska, Łąkoć, Łodzierz, Łosośniki, Malęcino, Męciny, Miłocice, Obrowo, Okunino, Olszewiec, Ostrowo, Pasieka, Piaszczyna, Ponikła, Popowice, Potok, Potok-Młyn, Pożyczki, Przemkowo, Przeradz, Przęsin, Role, Słosinko, Stachowo, Studnica, Szydlice, Świerzenko, Świerznik, Świerzno, Świeszynko, Świeszyno, Toczeń, Trzcinno, Trzebieszyno, Turowo, Tursko, Wałdowo, Węglewo, Węgorzynko, Wiatrołom, Wołcza Mała, Wołcza Wielka, Zadry, Zajączkowo, Znakowo, Żabno and Żarna.

Neighbouring gminas
Gmina Miastko is bordered by the gminas of Biały Bór, Kępice, Koczała, Kołczygłowy, Lipnica, Polanów, Trzebielino and Tuchomie.

References
Polish official population figures 2006

Miastko
Bytów County

de:Miastko#Gmina (Gemeinde) Miastko